Maibam Linthoingambi Devi (born 2 February 1999) is an Indian women's professional footballer who play as  goalkeeper for  India women's national football team. She played for Kickstart in the Indian Women's League.

She was also a member of 2020 AFC Women's Olympic Qualifying Tournament.

Honours

India
 SAFF Women's Championship: 2019
 South Asian Games Gold medal: 2019

KRYPHSA
Indian Women's League runner-up: 2019–20

Manipur
 Senior Women's National Football Championship: 2019–20
 National Games Gold medal: 2022

Individual
 Indian Women's League Best Goalkeeper: 2018–19, 2019–20, 2021–22

References

External links 
 Maibam Linthoingambi Devi at All India Football Federation
 

Living people
1999 births
People from Thoubal district
Indian women's footballers
India women's international footballers
India women's youth international footballers
Gokulam Kerala FC Women players
Kryphsa F.C. Players
Eastern Sporting Union players
Footballers from Manipur
Sportswomen from Manipur
Women's association football goalkeepers
South Asian Games gold medalists for India
South Asian Games medalists in football
Indian Women's League players